Banana Man is Ghoti Hook's second CD on Tooth and Nail Records.  It continues the band's trademark sound started with Sumo Surprise, combining Christianity with humor and fast melodic punk.

Track listing 
 Banana Man
 Estevan
 My Bike 
 The Box
 Middle Ground 
 Running Away 
 The Box 
 Just Fools 
 Cowboy 
 Untitled Track 
 Love by the Numbers
 At the Zoo  
 The Box 
 Monsters  
 Gimme a Chance 
 The Box

"The Box" is the name for four separate tracks, all the same song played at different speeds.  The untitled track is three seconds long, and consists of someone yelling in Spanish, "Yo quiero mandar besos y brasos a la toda la Bolivia!"  In English, this is "I want to give kisses and hugs to all of Bolivia!"

Ghoti Hook albums
1997 albums
Tooth & Nail Records albums